Kuś may refer to:

 Maciej Kuś (born 1982), Polish figure skater
 Marcin Kuś (born 1981), Polish professional footballer
 Mira Kuś (born 1958), Polish poet, journalist, and children's story author
 Stanisław Kuś, Polish constructor and architect

See also
Kus (disambiguation)

Polish-language surnames